Motive NYC Llc. (More commonly referred to as Motive NYC or Motive) is a digital design, marketing and branding agency with offices in New York City and Dublin, Ireland.

In 2009 Motive launched the Deborah Norville wellness campaign "New Way RA" for Johnson & Johnson Pharmaceuticals.  The program was created to help severe to moderate Rheumatoid Arthritis patients by offering interviews with leading professionals on health, wellness, fashion, nutrition and fitness.  The program featured notable guests such as Clinton Kelly and Ellie Krieger of Food Network.

In March 2009 Motive continued their work in the wellness area by executing the wellness campaign "Fit In Your Skin" hosted by fitness trainer and nutritionist Jackie Warner.  The successful program was geared toward moderate to severe psoriasis patients who sought an alternative outlet for wellness and fitness.  The program was in partnership with the National Psoriasis Foundation.

Founded by Chris Valentino in 2008, Motive's clients include CBS, Time Warner, MTV, Nickelodeon, History, Versus (TV channel), Chiller (TV channel), McDonald's, The Coca-Cola Company, News Corp, HGTV, Discovery, TLC, TBS, Comedy Central and HBO as well as advertising agencies/PR firms including Saatchi & Saatchi, and GSW.

Motive has created award-winning campaigns for Chiller (Alfred Hitchcock marathon), The History Channel (Battle BC) and Versus (Boston Marathon).

References

External links
 
 
 
 

Companies based in New York City
American companies established in 1997